Petty Romance is a 2010 South Korean 18-rated romantic comedy film about the fiery relationship between an adult cartoonist and a former sex columnist. The film was a moderate hit, selling 2,048,296 tickets nationwide.

Lead actors Lee Sun-kyun and Choi Kang-hee had previously starred together in the 2008 SBS TV series My Sweet Seoul.

Plot
Seoul, the present day. In need of money to redeem a treasured family portrait, struggling manhwa artist Jeong Bae takes part in a publishing company's competition for an adult manga with a prize of ₩130 million (US$100,000). Advised that his big weakness is his story-writing, Jeong Bae advertises for a professional writer and ends up hiring the self-important Han Da-rim, with whom he agrees to split the prize money 50-50 if they win. Unknown to Jeong Bae, Da-rim recently lost her job as a sex columnist at magazine Hot Girl — edited by her friend Ma Kyung-sun — where she compensated for her lack of experience with men by copying material from the Kama Sutra to the Kinsey Reports. For the manhwa competition, Da-rim comes up with the idea of a female assassin, Ma Mi-so, who keeps her male victims captive for erotic kicks; without telling Jeong Bae, she models the victim on her twin brother, womanising Han Jong-soo, who shares a flat with her and cannot wait for her to move out. She finally does, which leads Jeong Bae's friend (and fellow competitor) Hae-ryong, who has secretly bugged his flat, to believe they're having an affair. However, from her unrealistic sex scenes, Jeong Bae gradually comes to suspect that Da-rim has never actually "done it", and then realizes she's developed a crush on him.

Cast
Choi Kang-hee as Han Da-rim 
Lee Sun-kyun as Jeong Bae 
Ryu Hyun-kyung as Ma Kyung-sun 
Song Yoo-ha as Han Jong-soo 
Oh Jung-se as Hae-ryong
Baek Do-bin as Min-ho
Lee Won-jong as Lee Se-young
Park Sung-il as Byung-doo
Jung Min-sung as Team Leader Park
Ryu Ji-hye as sexy woman
Yoon Jin-soo as glamorous woman
Yeo Moo-young as Min-ho's father
Park No-shik as unemployed man
Hwang Bo-ra as Bol-mae's older sister (cameo)
Jo Eun-ji as female employee at award ceremony (cameo)

References

External links
  
 
 

2010 films
2010 romantic comedy films
South Korean sex comedy films
2010s South Korean films
2010s Korean-language films